The 2012 World Ports Classic is the inaugural edition of the two-day cycle race between the port cities of Rotterdam and Antwerp. It is scheduled to start on 31 August 2012 and finish one day later on 1 September 2012.

Teams Participating

Stages

Leadership Classifications

References

2012
2012 in Belgian sport
2012 UCI Europe Tour
2012 in Dutch sport